The Wright StreetAir is a low-floor single-decker electric bus design built by Wrightbus in Ballymena, Northern Ireland since 2017. An integral product based on a single-deck variant of the Wright StreetDeck chassis, the StreetAir replaces the Wright Electrocity in Wrightbus' product range.

The StreetAir was initially revealed in August 2016 as the replacement for the Wright Electrocity. It is based on a single-deck, all-electric version of the Wright StreetDeck integral double-decker bus. The StreetAir is available in a single 10.6 metre length weighing 18 tonnes. The body design of the StreetAir is based on the Wright Eclipse 3. The StreetAir is available with electricity conduction via overnight (plug-in), inductive (through the road surface) or conductive (with a pantograph) methods.

The first six StreetAirs entered service with Lothian Buses in October 2017. Aside from a single prototype vehicle trialled with bus operators in London, no further StreetAirs have been built as of August 2021.

Unbuilt variants 
When the StreetAir was first launched in August 2016, it was also offered as a double-decker bus based on the Wright StreetDeck and as a shorter-wheelbase single-decker bus based on the Wright StreetLite WF as opposed to the longer door-forward StreetDeck chassis. The short wheelbase variant was intended to replace the Wright StreetLite EV, with a number of drivetrain improvements over the previous model. None of either variant had been built by the time Wrightbus entered administration in September 2019, and both were dropped from the Wrightbus range after they exited administration.

References 

Electric buses
Low-floor buses
Midibuses
Vehicles introduced in 2016
StreetAir